Ladislaus II (also spelled Vladislav II or Władysław II) may refer to:

 Władysław II the Exile (1105–1159), Duke of Poland and Silesia
 Ladislaus II of Hungary (1131–1163), king of Hungary from 1162 to 1163
 Vladislaus II of Bohemia (died 1174), second king of Bohemia
 Vladislav II of Serbia (c. 1280–1325), Serbian monarch
 Władysław II of Opole (c. 1332–1401), Duke of Opole 
 Wladyslaw II Jagiello, a.k.a. Jogaila (1351–1434), Grand Duke of Lithuania and King of Poland
 Vladislaus II of Bohemia and Hungary (1456–1516), King of Bohemia and King of Hungary
 Vladislav II of Wallachia, Prince of Wallachia (d. 1456)

See also
 Ladislaus (disambiguation)
 Ladislaus Jagiello (disambiguation)